This is a list of television programmes that are airing on Hungama TV in India.

Current programming 
 Bhaiyyaji Balwan
 Crayon Shin-chan
 Gon The Stone Age Boy
 Kiteretsu
 Lucky Man
 Perman
 Selfie With Bajrangi
 Supa Strikas
 The Daltons
 The Gutsy Frog
 Tsurupika Hagemaru
 Upin & Ipin

Former programming

Live-action

 Are You Afraid of the Dark?
 Backyard Science
 Chooha Mantar
 Colgate Muskurahatein
 Door Door Doorbeen
 Dum Dum
 Dharam Veer
 Full Toss
 Fungama
 Gol Gol Gulam
 Hatim
 Hero - Bhakti Hi Shakti Hai
 Hip Hip Hurray
 Hungama Fungama
 Kaarthika
 Kabhi Hero Kabhi Zero
 Kaun Anadi Kaun Khiladi
 Khabdoo Bigdoo
 Kya Mujhse Dosti Karoge
 Loomba
 Majooba Ka Ajooba
 Mr. Funtoosh
 Ninja Warrior
 Noddy Aur Daddy
 Paowan
 Poochne Bhi Do Yaaron
 Power Rangers Dino Thunder
 Power Rangers Lightspeed Rescue
 Power Rangers Ninja Storm
 Power Rangers Operation Overdrive
 Power Rangers RPM
 Power Rangers SPD
 Power Rangers Wild Force
 Sanya
 Shaka Laka Boom Boom
 Shisha — Kahani Ek Raaz Ki
 Telematch
 Tiger
 Veer
 Zoran

Animated series

 Arthur
 Being Ian
 Bolek and Lolek
BoBoiBoy
 Bola Kampung
Boyster
 Bunty Aur Billy 
 Chacha Bhatija
 Chai Chai
 Fifi and the Flowertots
 Fireman Sam
 Freaktown
 Grami's Circus Show
Harry & Bunnie
 Hum Chik Bum
 Inspector Chingum
Jay Jay the Jet Plane
 Lunar Jim
 Luv Kushh
 Martin Morning
 P5 - Pandavas 5
 Peep and the Big Wide World
 Pororo the Little Penguin
 Rolling with the Ronks! 
 Shuriken School
 Slugterra
 Space Goofs
 Supa Strikas
 The Eena Meena Deeka Chase Comedy Show
 Ultimate Book of Spells
 ViR: The Robot Boy

 Beyblade
 Blacky the Funny Dog
Chimpui
 Detective Conan
 Digimon Xros Wars
Doraemon
 The Genie Family
 Gigant Big Shot Tsukasa
 KochiKame
 Ninjaboy Rantaro
 Ojarumaru
 Pokémon
 Robotan
 Sonic X
 Tensai Bakabon
 Tokyo Pig
 Ultra B
 Yu-Gi-Oh!

Films

Chacha Bhatija films

Fatak Patak films

See also
Disney Channel
Marvel HQ
Pogo
Cartoon Network
Nickelodeon
List of Indian animated television series

References 

Lists of television series by network
Hungama

Disney India Media Networks
Anime television
Disney Channel related-lists